is a former district located in the former Sanuki Province (now Kagawa Prefecture), Japan. From the Meiji period onward, it was part of Kagawa Prefecture. Toyota District was dissolved by being incorporated into the neighboring Mitoyo District.

Former districts of Kagawa Prefecture